The 2003–04 CERH European League was the 39th edition of the CERH European League organized by CERH. Its Final Four was held on 15 and 16 May 2004 at PalaBarsacchi, in Viareggio, Italy.

Preliminary round

|}

First round
The four eliminated teams with best ranking joined the CERS Cup.

|}

Group stage
In each group, teams played against each other home-and-away in a home-and-away round-robin format.

The two first qualified teams advanced to the Final Four.

Group A

Group B

Final four
The Final Four was played at PalaBarsacchi, in Viareggio, Italy.

Barcelona achieved its 15th title.

Bracket

External links
 CERH website
 Results at Rinkhockey.net

2003 in roller hockey
2004 in roller hockey
Rink Hockey Euroleague